Fantastico was an Italian Saturday night variety show broadcast by Rai 1 from 1979 to 1991, with an interruption in 1980, when it was replaced by the game show Scacco Matto. The TV program was linked with the Italian national lottery, and every edition consisted of 13 episodes with the final episode broadcast on 6 January, with the extraction of the winning tickets.

The show was generally different in its structure from one edition to another; the first edition was seen by an average of 23.6 million viewers. During the years the ratings dropped, and after a disappointing edition hosted by Raffaella Carrà and Johnny Dorelli (7.8 million viewers) the show was replaced by the variety-quiz Scommettiamo che?.

An attempt to revive the show was made in 1997, but Fantastico Enrico (so titled as a reference to the presenter Enrico Montesano) obtained low ratings and Montesano eventually abandoned the show.

Several opening songs of the show charted, and two of them (Heather Parisi's "Disco Bambina" and "Cicale") peaked first at the Italian hit parade.

Editions

References

1979 Italian television series debuts
1991 Italian television series endings
Italian television shows
RAI original programming
1970s Italian television series
1980s Italian television series
1990s Italian television series